Epipyrops grandidieri is a moth in the Epipyropidae family. It was described by Viette in 1961. It is found in Madagascar.

References

Moths described in 1961
Epipyropidae